Prestige Ameritech is an American manufacturer of surgical masks and respirators based in North Richland Hills, Texas. The company produced over a million surgical masks per day during the height of the 2009 swine flu pandemic, and rose to prominence again during the COVID-19 pandemic.

According to a whistleblower complaint by Rick Bright, former director of the Biomedical Advanced Research and Development Authority (BARDA), Prestige Ameritech offered to provide masks in January 2020 but was rebuffed by the Trump administration. Executive Vice President Michael Bowen noted that in the event of a "dire situation", his company could increase production by 1.7 million N95 masks per week by reactivating four N95 manufacturing lines in "like-new" condition at significant cost, but would require a major financial commitment from the government. White House economic adviser Peter Navarro said that "the company was just extremely difficult to work and communicate with."

On January 27 Bowen wrote to Bright, "Rick, I think we’re in deep s***. The world." The same week Bowen predicted that China would eventually stop exporting masks to the United States, which would be a major problem as half of the U.S. hospital supply came from China. Bright asked a deputy to explore the possibility of diverting money earmarked for other purposes such as vaccines and biodefense towards buying masks and raised the alarm at a senior-level meeting but his pleas were dismissed by his boss Robert Kadlec, whom he later accused of nepotism in his whistleblower complaint.

Ultimately FEMA took over mask acquisition for the government in March, during which Prestige submitted a bid. Bowen went on former White House Chief Strategist Steve Bannon's "War Room" podcast to press his case, and on April 7 Prestige won a $9.5 million FEMA contract to produce a million N95 masks per month over a period of one year at 79 cents apiece, a pace that did not require the company to restart its idle manufacturing lines. This deal was criticized as evidence of favoritism by the Trump administration, as this was only the second time in FEMA's history that a contract was awarded due to direct intervention by the president.

References

External links 
 Official website
 Whistleblower complaint by Rick Bright

Health care companies based in Texas
Manufacturing companies based in Texas
Companies associated with the COVID-19 pandemic